The action of 23 April 1794 took place between a British squadron of five frigates under the command of Sir John Borlase Warren and three frigates and a corvette under the command of Chef d'escadre F. Desgarceaux during the French Revolutionary Wars. Three of the French ships were captured.

The battle
On 21 April the frigate  sighted four distant ships in the English Channel. The next morning Minerva met Warren's squadron, and passed this information on. Warren promptly set off in pursuit, and at dawn the next day, around 4 a.m., sighted three frigates and a corvette about seven or eight leagues (24.5–28 nautical miles) south-west of Guernsey.

After an hour Concorde caught up with Engageante and attempted to disable her, intending to then attack the Résolue, leaving Engageante to Melampus and Nymphe, which were following.

However, while Concorde was engaged with Engageante, the Résolue dropped back and laid herself across Concorde bows, badly damaging her sails and rigging to the point where she was disabled. Having made hasty repairs Concorde came up again to re-engage the Engageante, which eventually surrendered at about 1.45 p.m. Résolue fired a few shots and then made off, pursued by Melampus and Nymphe, who chased her into Morlaix, before returning to assist Concorde which was towing the crippled Engageante to port.

Ships

Britain
 , (36) Sir John Borlase Warren, flagship
 , (38) Sir Edward Pellew
 , (36) Thomas Wells
 , (32) Sir Richard Strachan
 , (36) George Murray

France
 , (26) F. Desgarceaux, flagship  - captured by Concorde
 , (44) Étienne Pévrieu - captured by Arethusa
 , (36) Antoine-Marie-François Montalan - escaped
 , (22) Pierre-Joseph-Paul Belhomme - captured by Arethusa

See also

References

 

1794 in France
Conflicts in 1794
Naval battles of the French Revolutionary Wars
Naval battles involving Great Britain
Naval battles involving France